St Peter the Great or St Peter's is a suburb in the civil parish of St. Peter the Great County, in the city of Worcester, in the county of Worcestershire, England. It is south of the city centre, on the east side of the River Severn, near Junction 7 of the M5 motorway. In the 2011 census, the parish population was recorded as 5,851.

Church and parish
The parish is named after the Church of St Peter the Great (so named to distinguish it from the chapel of Worcester Castle, "St Peter the Less"), formerly located between King Street and Sidbury in Worcester, by the Royal Worcester porcelain factory (now the Museum of Royal Worcester). The medieval church was rebuilt in brick in the style of a Commissioners' church in 1836/37. This building became structurally unsafe, was closed in 1972, declared redundant in 1974 and demolished in 1976. The church site is now housing and a car park (2016).

The church parish was joined with that of St Martin's Church, London Road, the combined parish of St Martin with St Peter being established on 1 August 1974. The congregation and the World War I memorial were transferred there.

The ancient parish included parts within and outside the city of Worcester. In 1894 the parish was divided civilly: the part within the county borough of Worcester became the civil parish of St Peter the Great City (merged into the civil parish of Worcester in 1898), the part outside the city became the civil parish of St Peter the Great County, the basis of the modern Parish of St Peter the Great.

St Peter's Parish Council was created in 1994.

Suburb
The Ordnance Survey map of 1977 shows St Peter the Great County as farmland, with a main road and a single country road with a few cottages. The housing estate was developed in the 1980s and 1990s.

St Peter the Great, or "St Peters" as it is commonly abbreviated to, is mainly a large housing estate with a large Tesco superstore, a petrol station and a small shopping area containing a Pub, a Vet, a Chinese takeaway, a chip shop, a dentist, a beauty salon, chemist, dry cleaner, charity shop and a part-time GP surgery close to the village hall. In 2007, despite objections from some local residents, a Baptist church  opened close to the centre of the estate, the church centre is used for worship, meetings and youth activities also meetings of other groups.
The pub, called Ale Hub, and the Vet replaced the site of a One-Stop convenience store after the store closed in 2019.

In September 2013, a large scale planning request was made to the County Council to build further dwellings, together with commercial and light industrial buildings.

References

External links
 A church near you: St Martin with St Peter

Populated places in Worcestershire
Geography of Worcester, England